Andrey Razin (born 1979) is a Belarusian footballer.

Andrei or Andrey Razin may also refer to:
Andrei Razin (ice hockey) (born 1973), Russian ice hockey player
Andrei Razin (singer) (born 1963), Soviet and Russian musician
Andrey Razin (sprinter) (born 1962), Soviet sprinter